The Broken Oath is a 1910 silent short film starring Florence Lawrence, directed by Harry Solter, and produced by Carl Laemmle. It was the first film to marquee the name of an actor, Lawrence, to promote a film.

Laemmle arranged elaborate publicity for the film, planting a fake news story in newspapers that Lawrence had been killed in a street-car accident. When this was widely picked up by other publications, he published advertisements saying that the original story was a lie and that she was starring in a new film to be released shortly (although some ads misspelled the film title as The Broken Bath).

References

External links
 

1910 films
American silent short films
American black-and-white films
Films directed by Harry Solter
1910 drama films
1910 short films
Silent American drama films
Fake news
Fake news in the United States
Independent Moving Pictures films
Films produced by Carl Laemmle
1910s English-language films
1910s American films